Yolanda García Serrano (born 1958) is a Spanish film director and writer, the winner of the 1994 Goya Award for Best Original Screenplay for the film All Men Are the Same.

Biography
García studied Public Relations and worked for a few years as a secretary while starting her studies in Dramatic Arts. She immediately began to participate in a theater group and to write small works, first for the children's audience and then for adults. She then began writing for film, television, and theater.

In 1986, and within a dramaturgy workshop of the National Center of New Trends, her play La llamada es del todo inadecuada was selected along with two others to be performed at the Círculo de Bellas Artes in Madrid. It was a completely new project in Spanish drama with a work framed in the theater of the absurd. Later she also went on to teach at the Community of Madrid's Cinematography and Audiovisual School.

In 1988, she began her career as a professional screenwriter with works for film, television programs, and series. From the beginning she formed a team working in collaboration with Manuel Gómez Pereira, Juan Luis Iborra, and Joaquín Oristrell. In 1994, and in collaboration with them, she won the Goya Award for Best Original Screenplay for All Men Are the Same. Among the series she has written for are Farmacia de guardia (1991–1995),  (2005), Clara Campoamor, and Fugitiva (2018). In movies, she wrote Why Do They Call It Love When They Mean Sex? (1993), Love Can Seriously Damage Your Health (1997), Queens (2005), and Mediterranean Food (2008). 

In 1997, García directed and wrote the screenplay for Amor de hombre with Juan Luis Iborra, which she later turned into a novel. The film won the 1st Award for the best film of the L.A. Gay & Lesbian Film Festival. After ten years removed from the scene, she returned in 1998 with a comedy about marriage, written specifically for three actresses – Carmen Balagué, and Rosario Santesmases – entitled Qué asco de amor. She received the Hogar Sur de Teatro de Comedias Award, organized by the Pedro Muñoz Seca Foundation. With Dónde pongo la cabeza, released in 2006, she won the Chivas Telón Award.

In 2000, again together with Juan Luis Iborra, she directed and wrote Km. 0, winner for the best film of the Torino Film Festival. Two years later, she premiered her first solo film, the family comedy Hasta aquí hemos llegado (2002). Her play Ser o no ser Cervantes, premiered in New York in 2010, won three Hispanic Organization of Latin Actors (HOLA) Awards. In 2011 she was the first Spanish woman to premiere and direct her own play in New York: Good sex. Good day. Lo que ellos ignoran de ellas. In 2013, she was commissioned as artistic director of the Premios Max gala, presented that year by actor .

García has always worked in the field of comedy, which was for her a way to face and overcome the most dramatic reality, until in 2016 she premiered her first drama, ¡Corre!, in collaboration with Joaquín Oristrell. This was based on her own experience, as she explained in an interview conducted by Pepa Fernández on the Radio Nacional de España program  in October 2017.

She has also made incursions into micro-theater with the play La novia de nuestro hijo no es nuestra hija.

Some of García's cinematic works feature leading or supporting performances by her daughter Cora Tiedra, who has also appeared on some television series.

Works
 1991 – Salsa rosa
 1994 – Todos los hombres sois iguales
 1997 – Amor de hombre
 2000 – Km. 0
 2002 – Hasta aquí hemos llegado

Television
 1991–1995 – Farmacia de Guardia
 2005 – Abuela de verano
 2018 – Fugitiva

Books
 1993 – Línea caliente
 1997 – Amor de hombre, novel based on the author's film script in collaboration with Juan Luis Iborra
 2000 – Siempre me enamoro del hombre equivocado
 2001 – De qué va eso del amor, in co-authorship with Verónica Fernández Rodríguez
 2004 – Mujer casada busca gente que la lleve al cine
 2007 – Descalza por la vida, in co-authorship with Verónica Fernández Rodríguez

Theater
 1986 – La llamada es del todo inadecuada
 1998 – Qué asco de amor
 2007 – Dónde pongo la cabeza
 2013 – Shakespeare nunca estuvo aquí, in co-authorship with Juan Carlos Rubio, Lope de Vega Award winner
 2016 – ¡Corre!, in collaboration with Joaquín Oristrell

References

External links
 

1958 births
20th-century Spanish dramatists and playwrights
20th-century Spanish women writers
21st-century Spanish women writers
Film directors from Madrid
Goya Award winners
Living people
Spanish women film directors
Spanish women novelists
Women dramatists and playwrights
Women television writers
Spanish women screenwriters
20th-century Spanish screenwriters
21st-century Spanish screenwriters